Erythrosine, also known as Red No. 3, is an organoiodine compound, specifically a derivative of fluorone.  It is a pink dye which is primarily used for food coloring. It is the disodium salt of 2,4,5,7-tetraiodofluorescein. Its maximum absorbance is at 530 nm in an aqueous solution, and it is subject to photodegradation.

Uses
It is used as a:

 food coloring
 printing ink
 biological stain
 dental plaque disclosing agent
 radiopaque medium
 sensitizer for orthochromatic photographic films
Visible light photoredox catalyst

Erythrosine is commonly used in sweets such as some candies and popsicles, and even more widely used in cake-decorating gels.  It is also used to color pistachio shells.  As a food additive, it has the E number E127.

Health effects 
As a result of efforts begun in the 1970s, in 1990 the U.S. Food and Drug Administration (FDA) had instituted a partial ban on erythrosine, citing research that high doses have been found to cause cancer in rats. A 1990 study concluded that  "chronic erythrosine ingestion may promote thyroid tumor formation in rats via chronic stimulation of the thyroid by TSH." with 4% of total daily dietary intake consisting of erythrosine B. A series of toxicology tests combined with a review of other reported studies concluded that erythrosine is non-genotoxic and any increase in tumors is caused by a non-genotoxic mechanism.

In June 2008, the Center for Science in the Public Interest (CSPI) petitioned the FDA for a complete ban on erythrosine in the United States, but the FDA has not taken any further action.

Regulation and prevalence

While erythrosine is commonly used in many countries of the world, it is less commonly used in the United States because Allura Red AC (Red #40) is generally used instead. Erythrosine can be used in colored food and ingested drugs in the USA without any restriction; however, its use is banned in cosmetics and external drugs.  The lake variant is also banned from use in the United States.

The European Food Safety Authority (Food Standards Scotland and the rest of the UK's Food Standards Agency which still follows its rulings) only allows erythrosine in processed cherries and pet foods.

Synonyms
Erythrosine B; Erythrosin B; Acid Red 51; C.I. 45430; FD & C Red No.3; E127;
2',4',5',7'-Tetraiodo-3',6'-dihydroxy-spiro[3H-isobenzofuran-1,9'-xanthen]-3-one disodium salt; Tetraiodofluorescein Sodium Salt; Calcoid Erythrosine N; 2,4,5,7-Tetraiodo-3,6-dihydroxyxanthene-9-spiro-1'-3H-isobenzofuran-3'-one disodium salt; 2',4',5',7'-Tetraiodofluorescein, disodium salt; C.I.Food Red 14; Aizen Erythrosine; Tetraiodifluorescein, disodium salt;  Spiro[isobenzofuran- 1(3H),9'-[9H]xanthen]-3-one, 3',6'-dihydroxy-2',4',5',7'-tetraiodo-, disodium salt.

Classification
It is listed under the following number systems:
 FD&C Red No. 3
 E number E127 (Food Red 14)
 Color Index no. 45430 (Acid Red 51)
 Bureau of Indian Standards No. 1697

References

External links 
 Bureau of Indian Standards: List of Indian Standards under mandatory certification
 Some more details, other common names

Fluorone dyes
Inks
Food colorings
Iodoarenes
Salts of carboxylic acids
Triarylmethane dyes
Organic sodium salts
E-number additives